Kokomo City Building is a historic municipal building located at Kokomo, Indiana.  It was designed by the architecture firm of Wing & Mahurin and built about 1893. It is a two-story, Richardsonian Romanesque style brick and limestone building on a raised basement.  It features rounded corner towers topped by conical roofs and a central stone arch entrance. In the rear (Southwest corner) of the building is the former fire station used until 1979.

It was listed on the National Register of Historic Places in 1981.

References

Kokomo, Indiana
City and town halls on the National Register of Historic Places in Indiana
Richardsonian Romanesque architecture in Indiana
Government buildings completed in 1893
Buildings and structures in Howard County, Indiana
National Register of Historic Places in Howard County, Indiana